Aaron Wilson (born 24 November 1991) is an Australian international lawn bowler.

Bowls career
Wilson won the 2016 World Junior Championships and won the gold medal with bowls partner Brett Wilkie in the pairs at the 2016 World Outdoor Bowls Championship and won a silver medal in the fours. He won the Australian Open singles title in 2013.

Wilson was selected as part of the Australian team for the 2018 Commonwealth Games on the Gold Coast in Queensland, where he won a gold medal in the singles. He is currently high performance coach of the Cabramatta Bowling Club in Sydney.

In 2020 he was selected for the 2020 World Outdoor Bowls Championship in Australia. The following year in 2021, he won his second Australian Open singles crown. In 2022, he competed in the men's singles and the men's pairs at the 2022 Commonwealth Games and won the gold medal in the men's singles.

References

External links
 Aaron Wilson at Bowls Australia
 

1991 births
Australian male bowls players
Bowls players at the 2018 Commonwealth Games
Bowls players at the 2022 Commonwealth Games
Bowls World Champions
Commonwealth Games gold medallists for Australia
Commonwealth Games medallists in lawn bowls
Living people
Sportsmen from Victoria (Australia)
20th-century Australian people
21st-century Australian people
Medallists at the 2018 Commonwealth Games
Medallists at the 2022 Commonwealth Games